The Catholic Evidence Guild is a loose international association of Roman Catholic lay volunteers which seeks to research and present clear and compelling explanations of the doctrine of the Roman Catholic Church. Their objective is to address incorrect impressions about the Church and its teachings. Individual groups are subject to the respective diocesan bishop.

History
The organisation was founded in the Diocese of Westminster, England towards the end of 1918.  By 1925 there were 20 to 30 branches throughout England.  That year Maisie Ward published a practical training outline.

The Westminster branch has spoken regularly at Speakers' Corner since its inception. Prospective speakers were put through a strict training system by the Guild, with the goal of enabling "the ordinary Catholic to explain the truths of his religion in such a way as to reach the understanding of the crowd."

A branch was formed in New York City by students of Fordham University, which in 1931 undertook radio broadcasts published pamphlets, and wrote magazine articles. Their first outdoor meeting was held in 1936 at Columbus Circle. Guild member Paul Bearing, who worked for the National Catholic Welfare Council War Relief was one of fourteen people killed July 28, 1945 when a B-25 crashed into the Council's offices in the Empire State Building. Bearing had given a talk only the evening before.  

There is also currently a branch in Guam (est. 2003).

Notable members
 Vincent McNabb O.P.
 Frank Sheed (c. 1922–1981)
 Maisie Ward
 Catherine Cecily O'Brien

References

External links

The Catholic Evidence Guild, New York Chapter
The Catholic Evidence Guild of Guam
"Soapbox Catholics: The Lay Witness of Sheed and Ward"

Catholic advocacy groups
Christian organizations established in 1918